Selling Out & Going Home is the third studio album by American indie rock band Get Set Go, released on January 23, 2007 on TSR Records. The album, released only a year after its predecessor Ordinary World, was recorded, mixed, and mastered at Stanley Recordings in June 2006. It's also the first album by the group to feature guitarist Jim Daley, who joined the group soon after production for Ordinary World ended.

Track listing

Personnel 
Adapted from the Selling Out & Going Home liner notes.

Michael "Mike TV" Torres – guitar, vocals, production
Jim Daley – guitar
Colin Schlitt – bass
Eric Summer – viola
Dava Palamaro – drums
John Would – production, recording, mixing, mastering
Dylan J. Hay Chapman – art direction, photography

References 

2007 albums
Get Set Go albums